John Best (died 1570) was Bishop of Carlisle from 1560 until his death.

Background

He was from  Halifax and attended King Henry VIII's College from 1538 to 1539.

Personal life and career

In 1550 he married Elizabeth Somner. In 1553 Best was canon of Wells and in 1559 he was made Rector of Romaldkirk. He was consecrated Bishop of Carlisle on 2 March 1561, after the previous Bishop had been deprived of his see, after performing Elizabeth I's coronation in Roman Catholic liturgy despite Elizabeth's Protestant faith.

Death

Best died in 1570, nine years after being consecrated Bishop of Carlisle.

Notes

Year of birth unknown
1570 deaths
Bishops of Carlisle
People from Halifax, West Yorkshire
Alumni of Christ Church, Oxford
16th-century Church of England bishops